Heritage Square station is an at-grade light rail station on the L Line of the Los Angeles Metro Rail system. It is located at the intersection of French Avenue and Pasadena Avenue in the western Montecito Heights neighborhood of Los Angeles.

The station is named after the nearby Heritage Square Museum and is located in the lower Arroyo Seco valley between the San Rafael Hills and Mount Washington. It is adjacent to the Arroyo Seco Parkway (also known as California State Route 110 and the Pasadena Freeway).

Heritage Square station opened on July 26, 2003, as part of the original Gold Line, then known as the "Pasadena Metro Blue Line" project. This station and all the other original and Foothill Extension stations will be part of the A Line upon completion of the Regional Connector project in 2023.

Service

Station layout

Hours and frequency

Former station names
During the construction and planning stages, Heritage Square station was originally planned to be named French station, after nearby French Avenue. It was one of three stations to be renamed shortly before the line's opening.  It was then renamed to Heritage Square/Arroyo (also signed as Heritage Square/The Arroyo) for the nearby Heritage Square Museum complex and the Arroyo Seco creek and canyon.  Metro now refers to the station by the shorter Heritage Square.

References

External links

L Line (Los Angeles Metro) stations
Montecito Heights, Los Angeles
Arroyo Seco (Los Angeles County)
Northeast Los Angeles
Railway stations in the United States opened in 2003
2003 establishments in California